Aurora is an unincorporated community in the town of Aurora, Florence County, Wisconsin, United States. Aurora is located across the Menominee River from Kingsford; it is served by County Highway N.

References

Unincorporated communities in Florence County, Wisconsin
Unincorporated communities in Wisconsin
Iron Mountain micropolitan area